My Special Tatay (International title: The Heart Knows / ) is a Philippine television drama family series broadcast by GMA Network. Directed by L.A. Madridejos, it stars Ken Chan in the title role. It premiered on September 3, 2018 on the network's Afternoon Prime line up replacing Hindi Ko Kayang Iwan Ka. The series concluded on March 29, 2019 with a total of 150 episodes. It was replaced by Inagaw na Bituin in its timeslot.

The series is streaming online on YouTube.

Premise
Boyet, a young man with mild intellectual disability who has a quiet and simple life with his mother, will be changed when they find out that he has a child. Despite their state in life and Boyet's condition, they will take care of the child along with the help of aunt Chona and Boyet's childhood friend, Carol.

Cast and characters

Lead cast
 Ken Chan as Boyet Mariano 

Supporting cast
 Jestoni Alarcon as Edgar Villaroman
 Teresa Loyzaga as Olivia "Via" Salcedo-Villaroman
 Lilet as Isay Mariano
 Carmen Soriano as Soledad Villaroman
 Jillian Ward as Odette S. Villaroman
 Candy Pangilinan as Chona "Chong" Mariano
 Arra San Agustin as Carol Flores
 Bruno Gabriel as Orville S. Villaroman

Guest cast
 John Kenneth Giducos as Deckdeck
 Phytos Ramirez as Jeff
 Cheska Diaz as Sheila Flores
 Barbara Miguel as Cindy Flores
 Rubi Rubi as Divine
 Matt Evans as young Edgar
 Valeen Montenegro as young Via
 Empress Schuck as young Isay
 Ashley Rivera as young Chona
 Dominic Roco as Peter Flores
 Elle Ramirez as young Sheila
 Soliman Cruz as Bernardo "Obet" Mariano
 Kyle Ocampo as Eunice
 Johnny Revilla as Faustino Salcedo
 Lito Legaspi as Simon Villaroman
 Bembol Roco as Stefano Palomares
 Bryce Eusebio as teen Boyet
 Euwenn Aleta as young Boyet and Angelo L. Mariano
 Dayara Shane as teen Carol
 Rita Daniela as Susan "Aubrey" P. Labrador-Mariano
 Mikoy Morales as Joselito "Ote" Mendiola
 Jhoana Marie Tan as Britney
 Jazz Ocampo as Erika
 Kristine Abbey as Annie
 Joemarie Nielsen as Bert
 Cyruzz King as Paeng
 Angeli Bayani as Myrna Palomares Labrador
 ER Villa as baby Angelo L. Mariano
 Arny Ross as Monique Roque
 Agimat Maguigad, Cajo Tan, Clint Limbas, JR Palero and Rommel Calupitan as the Katambays
 Alchris Galura as Joel Dimaano
 Jon Romano as Rudy Flores
 Kiel Rodriguez as Dan
 Bernard Vios as Xander
 Frances Makil-Ignacio as Mamita
 Ayra Mariano as Anna
 Tonio Quiazon as Antonio Aguilar
 Lou Veloso as Miong
 Martin del Rosario as Gardo Guzman
 Jervi Cajarop as Bogart

Ratings
According to AGB Nielsen Philippines' Nationwide Urban Television Audience Measurement People in television homes, the pilot episode of My Special Tatay earned a 6.6% rating.

Accolades

References

External links
 
 

2018 Philippine television series debuts
2019 Philippine television series endings
Filipino-language television shows
GMA Network drama series
Television shows set in the Philippines